

Kirsten Lindholm, born Kirsten Lindholm Andreassen on 1 September 1943 in Odense, Denmark, was a model and a film actress in Hammer horror movies, in which she first appeared as Kirsten Betts. She is now a yoga instructor and performer currently living in New Zealand and is now known as Elandra Kirsten Meredith and by the Sikh religious name Vikram Kaur Khalsa.

She was raised in New Zealand, where she won prizes for ballroom dancing. While majoring in languages at Auckland University, she acted in several plays.

In the late 1960s and early 1970s, as Kirsten Betts and then Kirsten Lindholm, she was an actress and model. She appeared in a London play called Pyjama Tops (1969), in the movie Zeta One (1969), and then in four Hammer horror movies: The Vampire Lovers (1970), in which her character is beheaded before the opening titles and during filming for which she appeared as one of a "[v]ampire quintet" on the cover of ABC Film Review, Crescendo (1970), Twins of Evil (1971), where her role has been cited as an example of psychological violence, and Lust for a Vampire (1971).

At a yoga class in England, she met Vic Briggs, who had converted to Sikhism and taken the name Vikram Singh; they fell in love and married after moving to California, and she took the Sikh religious name Vikram Kaur Khalsa. They ran a Sikh ashram in San Diego. After living in Hawaii, where she worked as a healing practitioner and founded Ho'omana Ke Laka Healing workshops, she and her husband moved in 2008 to the Hibiscus Coast, New Zealand, where they both teach yoga. She also sang backup for her husband on his One in the Goddess album.

Filmography

Television
Die Zwei , Teil 10 Angie...Angie
Festival der Mörder.
 Doctor in the House (5 episodes, 1970) as Ingrid
 UFO (1 episode "Timelash", 1971)
 Birds on the Wing (1 episode, 1971) as Ingrid
 The Persuaders! (1 episode "Angie, Angie", 1971) as Marissa Nave
 The Golden Shot (4 episodes, 1971) as Herself, Maid of the Month

Film
 Zeta One (1969) as Angvisa Girl
 Julius Caesar (1970) as slavegirl
 Crescendo (1970) as Catherine
 The Vampire Lovers (1970) as 1st Vampire
 Lust for a Vampire (1971) as Peasant Girl
 Twins of Evil (1971) as Young Girl at Stake

See also
 Amritdhari

References

External links
 
 Elandra Kirsten Meredith résumé at StarNow.com
 Elandra Health Healing

Living people
1943 births
People from Odense
Converts to Sikhism
Danish Sikhs
20th-century Danish actresses